The 2008–09 Ulster Rugby season was Ulster's 15th season since the advent of professionalism in rugby union, and their only full season under head coach Matt Williams.

David Humphreys, who retired at the end of last season, was appointed to the newly created role of operations director, reporting to chief executive Michael Reid. Peter Sharp joined as defence coach in August 2008. Former Ulster players Jonny Bell and Niall Malone joined the academy as Elite Player Development Officers.

New signings included Humphreys' younger brother Ian, who had been playing for Leicester Tigers since 2005. Fijian winger Timoci Nagusa joined from Tailevu Knights.

Ulster finished third in their Heineken Cup pool, and eighth in the Celtic League. One highlight of an otherwise disappointing season was a win over Munster at Thomond Park in January, the first time Munster had lost at home in European competition. Three of Ulster's five tries came from Ian Humphreys' assists. Ulster qualified for next season's Heineken Cup as one of Ireland's top three teams, finishing ahead of Connacht in the league. Matt Williams left by mutual consent at the end of the season. Assistant coach Steve Williams also left after his contract was not renewed. For the following season, Ulster put a new management structure in place. Michael Reid was chief executive; David Humphreys was director of rugby, with overall responsibility for the senior team, the Ulster 'A' team (renamed the Ulster Ravens), the Ulster under-20s and the academy; and Brian McLaughlin was appointed head coach, assisted by forwards coaches Jeremy Davidson and Peter Sharp, and backs coach Neil Doak.

Rory Best was Ulster's Player of the Year, and flanker Stephen Ferris was selected for the 2009 British & Irish Lions tour to South Africa.

Staff

Squad

Senior squad

Players in
 BJ Botha (Natal Sharks)
 Robbie Diack (Stormers)
 Ian Humphreys (Leicester Tigers)
 Ed O'Donoghue (Queensland Reds)
 Daniel Roach
 Clinton Schifcofske (Queensland Reds) 
 Cillian Willis (Leinster)
 Timoci Nagusa (Tailevu Knights)
 T. J. Anderson (promoted from Academy)

Players out
 Tim Barker to Castres
 Mark Bartholomeusz to Padova
 Neil Best to Northampton Saints
 Simon Best (Retired)
 Tommy Bowe to Ospreys
 Kieran Campbell to Connacht
 Niall Conlon
 Kieran Hallett
 Justin Harrison to Bath Rugby
 David Humphreys (Retired)
 Adam Larkin (Retired)
 Matt Miles
 Neil McMillan to Harlequins
 Grant Webb to Newport Gwent Dragons
 Roger Wilson to Northampton Saints

Academy squad

Heineken Cup

Pool 4

Celtic League

Friendlies

Home attendance

Ulster Rugby Awards
The Ulster Rugby Awards ceremony was held on 14 May 2009 at the Ramada Hotel, Belfast. Winners were:

Ulster Rugby Personality of the Year: Stephen Ferris
Rugby Writers Player of the Year: Stephen Ferris
Ulster Player of the Year: Rory Best
Young Ulster Player of the Year: Darren Cave
Academy Player of the Year: Willie Faloon
Schools' Player of the Year: Niall Annett, Methodist College Belfast
Club of the Year: Ballynahinch RFC
Club Player of the Year: Chris Stevenson, Ballynahinch RFC
Youth Player of the Year: Stephen Irvine, Banbridge RFC
Dorrington B. Faulkner Award: William Davidson, Armagh

References

2008-09
2008–09 in Irish rugby union
2008–09 Celtic League by team
2008–09 Heineken Cup by team